Aştavul (also: Aşdağul) is a town (belde) in the Ortaköy District, Çorum Province, Turkey. Its population is 2,135 (2021).

References

Ortaköy District, Çorum
Populated places in Çorum Province
Towns in Turkey